Lepidopygopsis typus, the Peninsular hilltrout, is a species of cyprinid fish endemic to Kerala, India where it is only known from Periyar River and Periyar Lake. This species can reach a length of  TL. It is currently the only known member of its genus.

References

Cyprinid fish of Asia
Fish of India
Taxa named by B. Sundara Raj
Fish described in 1941